Elections to North Ayrshire Council took place on 5 May 2022 on the same day as the 31 other Scottish local government elections.

For the third consecutive election, the Scottish National Party (SNP) received the highest vote share and returned the most seats at 12 – one more than the previous election. The Conservatives built on their success from five years previous and bucked the national trend as they recorded their best-ever performance in a North Ayrshire election, leapfrogging Labour into second place with 10 seats. Labour fell from their position as the joint-largest party to third returning only nine councillors – their worst-ever performance in a North Ayrshire election. The number of independents elected fell from four to two.

The SNP subsequently took the leadership of the council, running a minority administration with Cllr Marie Burns elected as council leader.

Background

Previous election

At the previous election in 2017, the Scottish National Party (SNP) and Labour won the joint-most seat with 11 each. The SNP's number had reduced by one while Labour maintained their number of councillors. The Conservatives gained 6 seats to record their best result in a North Ayrshire election with seven while the number of independents fell from six to four.

Source:

Electoral system
Local elections in Scotland use the Single transferable vote (STV) electoral system in which voters rank candidates in order of preference. The 2022 election was the first to use the nine wards created under the Islands (Scotland) Act 2018, with 33 councillors being elected. Each ward – except Arran which returned one member – elected either three, four or five members, using the STV electoral system.

Composition
Since the previous election, several changes in the composition of the council occurred. Most were changes to the political affiliation of councillors including Labour councillor Jimmy Miller who resigned to become an independent and SNP councillor Ellen McMaster who first joined Alba before becoming an independent. One by-election was held after SNP councillor Joy Brahim resigned due to ill health and resulted in a gain for the Conservatives.

Retiring councillors

Source:

Boundary changes
Following the implementation of the Islands (Scotland) Act 2018, a review of the boundaries was undertaken in North Ayrshire, Argyll and Bute, Highland, Orkney Islands, Shetland Islands and the Western Isles. The act allowed for single- or two-member wards to be created to allow for better representation of island communities. As a result, the number of wards in North Ayrshire was reduced from 10 to nine but the number of councillors will remain at 33. No changes were proposed in Kilwinning or the three Irvine wards. The former Ardrossan and Arran ward was split into two wards – a single-member ward for the island of Arran and a three-member ward for Ardrossan. A single ward for Saltcoats and Stevenson was reintroduced after it was split into two separate wards prior to the 2017 election however the area will be represented by five members rather than four as was the case between 2007 and 2017. The former Dalry and West Kilbride, Kilbirnie and Beith, and North Coast and Cumbraes wards were reorganised from two three- and one four-member wards into two five-member wards: North Coast and Garnock Valley.

Candidates
The total number of candidates increased from 70 in 2017 to 74. As was the case five years previous, the SNP fielded the highest number of candidates at 17 across the nine wards – two less than in 2017. Both Labour and the Conservatives also fielded at least one candidate in every ward but the 14 candidates fielded by Labour was three less than in 2017 whereas the 11 candidates named by the Conservatives was an increase of one. The Greens again contested three wards while the Liberal Democrats contested an election in North Ayrshire for the first time in a decade after they named six candidates. The number of independent candidates fell from 15 in 2017 to 12. Socialist Labour named two candidates, an increase of one, while the Scottish Socialist Party and the Trade Unionist and Socialist Coalition (TUSC) again named one candidate. For the first time, the Scottish Family Party (three candidates), the Independence for Scotland Party (ISP) (two candidates), the Alba Party and the Freedom Alliance (both one candidate) fielded candidates in a North Ayrshire election. Neither the UK Independence Party (UKIP) or the British Unionist Party, who had both contested the 2017 election, fielded any candidates.

Results

Source: 

Note: Votes are the sum of first preference votes across all council wards. The net gain/loss and percentage changes relate to the result of the previous Scottish local elections on 4 May 2017. This is because STV has an element of proportionality which is not present unless multiple seats are being elected. This may differ from other published sources showing gain/loss relative to seats held at the dissolution of Scotland's councils.

Ward summary

|- class="unsortable" align="centre"
!rowspan=2 align="left"|Ward
! %
!Cllrs
! %
!Cllrs
! %
!Cllrs
! %
!Cllrs
!rowspan=2|TotalCllrs
|- class="unsortable" align="center"
!colspan=2|SNP
!colspan=2|Lab
!colspan=2|Con
!colspan=2|Others
|-
|align="left"|North Coast
|bgcolor="#efe146"|31.0
|bgcolor="#efe146"|2
|10.1
|0
|30.1
|2
|28.8
|1
|5
|-
|align="left"|Garnock Valley
|bgcolor="#efe146"|31.3
|bgcolor="#efe146"|2
|14.1
|1
|24.8
|1
|29.8
|1
|5
|-
|align="left"|Ardrossan
|bgcolor="#efe146"|41.2
|bgcolor="#efe146"|1
|27.0
|1
|20.0
|1
|11.8
|0
|3
|-
|align="left"|Arran
|25.7
|0
|10.0
|0
|bgcolor="#add8e6"|32.4
|bgcolor="#add8e6"|1
|31.9
|0
|1
|-
|align="left"|Saltcoats and Stevenson
|39.6
|2
|bgcolor="#eea2ad"|40.2
|bgcolor="#eea2ad"|2
|11.4
|1
|8.8
|0
|5
|-
|align="left"|Kilwinning
|34.9
|1
|bgcolor="#eea2ad"|46.0
|bgcolor="#eea2ad"|2
|15.6
|1
|3.4
|0
|4
|-
|align="left"|Irvine West
|bgcolor="#efe146"|40.7
|bgcolor="#efe146"|2
|29.8
|1
|20.0
|1
|9.6
|0
|4
|-
|align="left"|Irvine East
|bgcolor="#efe146"|44.5
|bgcolor="#efe146"|1
|27.2
|1
|19.8
|1
|8.4
|0
|3
|-
|align="left"|Irvine South
|bgcolor="#efe146"|44.6
|bgcolor="#efe146"|1
|32.4
|1
|19.4
|1
|3.6
|0
|3
|- class="unsortable" class="sortbottom"
!align="left"| Total
!36.3
!12
!25.4
!9
!21.7
!10
!16.6
!2
!33
|}

Source:

Seats changing hands
Below is a list of seats which elected a different party or parties from 2017 in order to highlight the change in political composition of the council from the previous election. The list does not include defeated incumbents who resigned or defected from their party and subsequently failed re-election while the party held the seat. Due to boundary changes, some wards may differ between the 2017 and 2022 elections.

Notes

Ward results
At the previous election, the North Coast and Garnock Valley wards were previously represented by three wards: Dalry and West Kilbride, Kilbirnie and Beith and North Coast and Cumbraes. The three wards elected 10 councillors in total including three SNP, three independents, two Labour and two Conservatives. The newly created wards elected four SNP, three Conservatives, two independents and one Labour resulting in a gain for the SNP and the Conservatives and a loss each for Labour and independent candidate Robert Barr.

North Coast

Garnock Valley

Ardrossan
At the previous election, Ardrossan was included in a ward representing Ardrossan and Arran which returned one SNP, one Labour and one Conservative councillor. The new ward returned the same political mix despite the boundary changes.

Arran
At the previous election, Arran was included in a ward representing Ardrossan and Arran. The newly re-established Arran ward resulted in a Conservative win.

Saltcoats and Stevenston
At the previous election, Saltcoats and Stevenston was represented by two separate wards, one for Saltcoats and one for Stevenston. In total, they elected six councillors including three Labour, two SNP and an independent. The newly re-established ward which had been used between 2007 and 2017 elected two SNP, two Labour and one Conservative councillor resulting in a Conservative gain and a loss for Labour and independent candidate Ronnie McNicol. Independent candidate Jimmy Miller was elected as a Labour candidate in 2017 but later resigned from the party.

Kilwinning
Labour (2), the SNP (1) and the Conservatives (1) retained the seats they won at the previous election.

Irvine West
The SNP retained the seat they had won at the previous election and gained one from Labour while the Conservatives retained their only seat and Labour retained one of their two seats.

Irvine East
The SNP, Labour and the Conservatives retained the seats they had won at the previous election.

Irvine South
The SNP, Labour and the Conservatives retained the seats they had won at the previous election.

Aftermath
The SNP recorded one of their best results in North Ayrshire and group leader Cllr Marie Burns said after the election that she was "so pleased and so grateful to the people of North Ayrshire for putting their trust in us". Despite losing support and placing third in the popular vote, the Conservatives recorded their best-ever result in a North Ayrshire election by becoming the second-largest party on the council. Conservative group leader Cllr Tom Marshall said the result was "a great achievement" as the party bucked the national trend which saw the Conservatives lose seats. In contrast, Labour recorded their worst election performance in North Ayrshire as they slipped to third with nine seats. Outgoing council leader and Labour group leader Cllr Joe Cullinane said that he did not believe the result was a "reflection of the campaign we ran nor the work we did in administration" and that he was "really gutted".

After winning the largest number of seats, the SNP formed a minority administration to take control of the council for the first time since 2016. Cllr Marie Burns was elected council leader and Cllr Shaun MacAuley was elected as depute leader. Cllr Anthea Dickson was elected as Provost and Labour councillor John Sweeney was elected as Depute Provost.

Notes

References

North Ayrshire Council elections
North Ayrshire